"Ya Hey" is a song by American indie pop band Vampire Weekend, taken from their third studio album Modern Vampires of the City. It was released as the second single from the album on May 3, 2013 through XL Recordings. An official music video of the single, featuring the lyrics, was uploaded on May 3, 2013.

Critical reception
"Ya Hey" received very positive reviews from critics. Ian Cohen of Pitchfork described the song as "a staggering duality of childish innocence and poetic confidence" and an "impossibly catchy song that skips along while carrying the weight of the universe," and awarded it Best New Track. Robert Leedham of Drowned in Sound praised the new directness of the lyrics compared to Vampire Weekend's earlier songs, saying, "Rather than dropping oblique reference points at every turn, Koenig adopts a magnificently blasphemous posture from start to finish." Musically, Leedham described the song as a "euphoric cocktail" and praised its "righteous swirl of drums, bass, plaintive piano, shrill vocoder and gospel chanting." Pretty Much Amazing also compared the song favorably to the band's earlier work, arguing that, "unlike the absurdly catchy, frivolous 'ay ay ay's of "A-Punk", the 'ya-heys' of 'Ya Hey' are filled with meaning," and called the song "a brilliant stomp-along anthem." The A.V. Club called "Ya Hey" "not the album's strongest song, but the one probably most destined to be talked about...In a way, "Ya Hey" feels like a bridge for whatever might be coming next for Vampire Weekend."

Personnel
Vampire Weekend
 Chris Baio – bass
 Rostam Batmanglij – piano, guitars, banjo, vocal harmonies and backing vocals, drum and synth programming, keyboards, shaker
 Ezra Koenig – lead vocals
 Chris Tomson – drums

Technical
 Rich Costey – mixing
 Chris Kasych – mix assistance, Pro Tools engineering
 Eric Isip – assistance
 Emily Lazar – mastering
 Joe LaPorta – mastering

Charts

References

External links

God and Man on 'Modern Vampires of the City'

2013 songs
Vampire Weekend songs
XL Recordings singles
2013 singles
Songs written by Ezra Koenig
Song recordings produced by Ariel Rechtshaid